Debra Anne Haaland (born December 2, 1960) is an American politician serving as the 54th United States Secretary of the Interior. A member of the Democratic Party, she served as chair of the New Mexico Democratic Party from 2015 to 2017 and as the U.S. representative for New Mexico's 1st congressional district from 2019 to 2021. Haaland is a Native American and enrolled citizen of the Laguna Pueblo tribe.

Haaland's congressional district included most of Albuquerque and most of its suburbs. Along with Sharice Davids, she is one of the first two Native American women elected to the U.S. Congress. She is a political progressive who supports the Green New Deal and Medicare for All.

On December 17, 2020, then President-elect Joe Biden announced that he would nominate Haaland to serve as Secretary of the Interior. She was confirmed by the United States Senate on March 15, 2021, by a vote of 51–40. Following her swearing-in on March 16, she became the first Native American to serve as a Cabinet secretary and the second to serve in the Cabinet, after Republican former vice president and Kaw Nation citizen Charles Curtis.

Early life and education
Haaland was born in Winslow, Arizona. She is an enrolled member of the Laguna Pueblo. The Pueblo people have lived on the land that is now the state of New Mexico since the 1200s and Haaland identifies herself as a 35th-generation New Mexican. Her mother, Mary Toya, a Native American woman, served in the United States Navy. Her father, Major John David "Dutch" Haaland, a Norwegian Minnesotan, was an officer in the United States Marine Corps and recipient of the Silver Star for his actions in Vietnam; he was buried with full military honors at Arlington National Cemetery in 2005. As a child in a military family, Haaland moved frequently. She attended 13 public schools across the United States before the family settled in Albuquerque, New Mexico, to be close to family who also belong to the Laguna Pueblo. Haaland graduated from Highland High School in Albuquerque. She has two sisters, a brother, and two half-sisters.

After graduating from Highland High School, Haaland worked at a local bakery. In 1988, she enrolled at the University of New Mexico, where she earned her Bachelor of Arts in English in 1994. Her professors included future United States Poet Laureate Joy Harjo. Four days after graduating, she gave birth to her child, Somáh. As a single mother, Haaland started a salsa company to support herself and her child. At times during this period, she did not earn enough money to afford housing and had to rely on friends for shelter. She also relied on food stamps at times. She earned her Juris Doctor in Indian law from the University of New Mexico School of Law in 2006, but is not a member of the New Mexico State Bar. Haaland became the first chairwoman elected to the Laguna Development Corporation Board of Directors, a Laguna-owned business created to strengthen the Laguna Community and its economy. As chairwoman, she oversaw business operations for the second-largest tribal gaming enterprise in New Mexico and successfully advocated for the corporation to create policies and commitments to earth-friendly business practices. She served as the tribal administrator for the San Felipe Pueblo from January 2013 to November 2015.

Earlier political career
In 2012, Haaland served as the state's vote director for Native Americans in Barack Obama's 2012 presidential reelection campaign. She served as the chair of Democratic Party of New Mexico Native American Caucus from 2012 to 2013. She ran for Lieutenant Governor of New Mexico in 2014. Her ticket, headed by then-Attorney General of New Mexico Gary King, the Democratic nominee for Governor of New Mexico, lost to the Republican ticket of Governor Susana Martinez and Lieutenant Governor John Sanchez.

Haaland was elected to a two-year term as the chair of the Democratic Party of New Mexico in April 2015. During her tenure, New Mexico Democrats regained control of the New Mexico House of Representatives and the office of the New Mexico Secretary of State. Haaland has been credited with rebuilding the state party after large defeats for Democrats in New Mexico in 2014. She raised enough money during her two-year term as chair to pay off seven years' worth of debt incurred under previous chairs.

U.S. House of Representatives

Elections

2018 

Haaland defeated Damon Martinez and Antoinette Sedillo Lopez to win the Democratic Party nomination in June 2018, receiving 40.5% of the vote and winning every county in the district.

In the November 6 general election, Haaland defeated former New Mexico State Representative Janice Arnold-Jones, receiving 59.1% of the vote and winning three of the district's five counties. Her victory was part of a sweep of New Mexico that saw Democrats win every statewide and federal office on the ballot that year, along with expanding their majority in the New Mexico House of Representatives.

2020 

In the November 3 general election, Haaland defeated retired police detective Michelle Garcia Holmes, who ran for Lieutenant Governor of New Mexico in the 2018 gubernatorial election. Haaland subsequently received 58.2% of the vote.

Tenure

With Representative Sharice Davids of Kansas, a member of the Ho-Chunk Nation of Minnesota, elected simultaneously, Haaland was one of the first two Native American women to be seated in Congress. During the swearing-in ceremony in January 2019, Haaland wore traditional Pueblo dress, necklace and moccasins.

On March 7, 2019, during a debate on voting rights and campaign finance, Haaland became the first Native American woman to preside over the U.S. House of Representatives.

Haaland served as one of three co-chairs of Elizabeth Warren's 2020 presidential campaign.

Committee assignments
 Committee on Armed Services
 Subcommittee on Military Personnel
 Subcommittee on Readiness
 Committee on Natural Resources (Vice Chair)
 Subcommittee on Indigenous Peoples of the United States
 Subcommittee on National Parks, Forests and Public Lands (chair)
 Committee on Oversight and Reform
 Subcommittee on Civil Rights and Civil Liberties

Caucus memberships
 Congressional Native American Caucus (Co-chair)
 Congressional Progressive Caucus

Secretary of the Interior

Nomination and confirmation
On December 17, 2020, incoming President Joe Biden announced that he would nominate Haaland as Secretary of the Interior. Before Biden nominated Haaland, many senior Democrats had voiced their support for her as Secretary of the Interior, including House Speaker Nancy Pelosi, Majority Leader Steny Hoyer, and Senator Elizabeth Warren. Republican representatives Don Young and Tom Cole (a member of the Chickasaw Nation) also expressed their support for Haaland's nomination.

On March 15, 2021, Haaland was confirmed by the Senate 51–40, with four Republicans (Collins, Murkowski, Sullivan, Graham) voting to confirm. She is the first Native American Cabinet secretary in U.S. history. Her departure from the House triggered a special election in 2021. Haaland was sworn in on March 18, 2021, wearing a combination of traditional Laguna Pueblo regalia and a colorful ribbon skirt, custom-made for her by Agnes Woodward.

Tenure
In April 2021, Haaland announced a new unit within Bureau of Indian Affairs that plans to tackle the decades-long crisis of missing and murdered Native Americans, saying, "We are fully committed to assisting Tribal communities with these investigations, and the MMU will leverage every resource available to be a force-multiplier in preventing these cases from becoming cold case investigations".

In May 2021, Haaland approved the new constitution of the Cherokee Nation with protections for Cherokee Freedmen.

In June 2021, Haaland announced the creation of the Federal Indian Boarding School Initiative. The initiative's goal is to investigate long-standing abuse in the now defunct residential boarding schools that housed Native American children under the 1819 Civilization Fund Act.

In November 2021, Haaland banned the word "squaw", a derogatory term for Native American women, from all federally owned lands, and ordered a task force to determine new names for the 650 places that currently use the word.

Electoral history

Personal life
Haaland has a child, Somáh, whom she raised on her own. Her hobbies include marathon running and gourmet cooking. Haaland is Catholic. On August 28, 2021, Haaland married her longtime partner, Skip Sayre, in Santa Ana Pueblo, New Mexico.

Haaland suffered a broken left fibula on July 17, 2022, while hiking in Shenandoah National Park.

See also
 List of Native American politicians
 List of Native Americans in the United States Congress
 Women in the United States House of Representatives
 List of secretaries of the interior

Notes

References

External links

 Biography at the United States Department of the Interior

 

|-

|-

|-

|-

1960 births
Living people
20th-century Native Americans
20th-century Native American women
20th-century Roman Catholics
21st-century American politicians
21st-century American women politicians
21st-century Native American politicians
21st-century Native American women
21st-century Roman Catholics
American people of Norwegian descent
Biden administration cabinet members
Catholics from Arizona
Catholics from New Mexico
Democratic Party members of the United States House of Representatives from New Mexico
Female members of the United States House of Representatives
Laguna Pueblo
Native American members of the United States Congress
Native American people from Arizona
Native American Roman Catholics
Native American women in politics
People from Winslow, Arizona
Pueblo people
United States Secretaries of the Interior
University of New Mexico School of Law alumni
Women in New Mexico politics
Women members of the Cabinet of the United States
Biden administration personnel